Liaodong Bay is largest and longest of the three main bays (along with Laizhou Bay to the south and the Bohai Bay to the southwest) of the Bohai Sea, the innermost gulf of the Yellow Sea.

Although named after the Liaodong Peninsula (which forms its eastern shore), the bay is located directly south of the Liaoxi region, almost entirely west of the Liao River.  It is bounded by the coastline of cities from southern Liaoning province (Dalian, Yingkou, Panjin, Jinzhou and Huludao) and eastern Hebei province (Qinhuangdao and Tangshan), between the Laotieshan Cape at Dalian's Lüshunkou District in the east, and the Daqing River estuary (which is an old southern mouth of Luan River) at Tangshan's Laoting County in the west.

The major rivers that drain into the Liaodong Bay include Luan River, Daling River, Xiaoling River, Liao River and Daliao River.

See also
 Geography of China
 Bijia Mountain - an island-mountain in the bay
  

Bays of China
Bohai Sea
Bodies of water of the Yellow Sea